Pigozzi is a surname. Notable people with the surname include:

Henri Pigozzi (Henri Théodore Pigozzi) (1898–1964), car merchant and industrialist
Jean Pigozzi (born 1952), Italian businessman, art collector, philanthropist, and photographer
Luciano Pigozzi (born 1927), Italian film actor